JOM may refer to

JOM (journal), formerly known as Journal of Metals
Journal of Macroeconomics
Journal of Macromarketing
Journal of Mammalogy
Journal of Management
Journal of Marketing
Journal of Materials
Journal of Mathematics
Journal of Medicine
Journal of Meningitis
Journal of Meteorology
Journal of Microencapsulation
Journal of Microscopy
Journal of Morphology
Journal of Multimedia
Journal of Music
Journal of Mycology